James Wood (17 July 1867 – 31 October 1936) was an Irish land refomer and, as a Russellite Unionist, was a Member of the United Kingdom Parliament (MP) for East Down.

Supported by what the Unionist leader Edward Carson described as "an unholy alliance of Catholics and Protestants", he was elected as a Russellite Unionist MP for the East Down constituency in a 1902 by-election, defeating Carson's candidate, the local landlord Colonel R.H. Wallace of Myra Castle. The victory boosted Thomas Russell's campaign for compulsory, and assisted, land sales to tenants, which won a measure of success in the Wyndham Land Act of 1903. Wood, standing as a Liberal, lost his seat at the 1906 general election to the Unionst James Craig. He lost again to Craig in the January 1910 general election.

On his death, the Irish News described him as "unsparing in his efforts on behalf of the downtrodden small farmers under the regime of landlordism".

External links

1865 births
1936 deaths
Russellite Unionist MPs
Members of the Parliament of the United Kingdom for County Down constituencies (1801–1922)
UK MPs 1900–1906